is a Japanese footballer who plays as a left back for Auckland City in the NRFL Premier.

Club career

Japan
Iwata began his football career with Gifu Technical High School between 1999 and 2001. Then he went to study at Hamamatsu University, where he also played for the college football team from 2002 and 2005. In 2006, Iwata began to play with FC Gifu. At the end of the 2006 season he was transferred to the club's B team, in which he played between 2007 and 2009.

Australia
In 2010, Iwata was signed by Edge Hill United in Cairns for the Far North Queensland Premier League in Australia . This club played there until 2011. Iwata was part of the team that won the 2011 Far North Queensland Premier League, and was named the club MVP. In addition, that season's Edge Hill United won the Matsuda Cup. In 2012, he went to play with Far North Queensland Bulls FC in the Queensland State League. Before the end of the season he was transferred again.

New Zealand
In 2012, Iwata was signed by Central United in the Northern League (New Zealand). In August, Central United won the 2012 Chatham Cup Final against Lower Hutt City AFC where they won by 6-1.

Iwata began to play with Auckland City FC in October 2012, becoming was part of the bronze medal winning team at the 2014 FIFA Club World Cup. Iwata played the entire game in the match against Cruz Azul to decide third place. That and a friendly between Auckland City and the Japan National Football Team have earned Iwata considerable press coverage in Japan.

Honours

Club
Edge Hill United
Far North Queensland Premier League: 2011
Matsuda Cup: 2011

Central United
Chatham Cup: 2012

Auckland City FC
FIFA Club World Cup 2014 Bronze Medal
OFC Champions League 2013 2014
ASB Premiership 2013-14
OFC President's Cup 2014
ASB Charity Cup 2013

Individual
Edge Hill United Player of the Year 2011 
Central United FC - Most Improved Player 2012
Auckland City FC - Sportsman of the Year 2013 & 2014

References

External links

 Official website 

1983 births
Living people
Sportspeople from Aichi Prefecture
Japanese footballers
Association football defenders
Cairns FC players
Auckland City FC players
New Zealand Football Championship players
Japanese expatriate footballers
Expatriate association footballers in New Zealand
Japanese expatriate sportspeople in New Zealand